Shama Aboobakar (born 6 July 1983) is a Mauritian badminton player.

Career
She competed at the 2006 and 2010 Commonwealth Games in the women's singles, doubles, mixed doubles, and team events. In 2012, she became a champion at the Mauritius International and Botswana International tournaments in women's singles event.

Achievements

African Championships 
Women's singles

Women's doubles

Mixed doubles

BWF International Challenge/Series
Women's singles

Women's doubles

Mixed doubles

 BWF International Challenge tournament
 BWF International Series tournament
 BWF Future Series tournament

References

External links 
 
 
 
 

1983 births
Living people
People from Plaines Wilhems District
Mauritian female badminton players
Badminton players at the 2006 Commonwealth Games
Badminton players at the 2010 Commonwealth Games
Commonwealth Games competitors for Mauritius
Competitors at the 2003 All-Africa Games
African Games bronze medalists for Mauritius
African Games medalists in badminton
21st-century Mauritian people